Glenn Parry is a professor in Digital Transformation at University of Surrey and was formally Professor of strategy and operations management at Bristol Business School, UWE. and senior visiting fellow with the University of Bath, UK. He authored and edited the textbook titled Service Design and Delivery published by Springer.

Personal life

Education

He received B.Sc and M.Phil degrees from University of Wales, Swansea in 1995 and 1997. In 2003, he obtained Certificate in Counselling and Psychotherapy from Coventry University, and Certificate in Teaching Higher Education and Diploma in Rogerian Counselling and Psychotherapy from University of Warwick in 2005. He completed his PhD from University of Cambridge in 2000.

Career

Parry was a leader of the 9 million Euro European Integrated Logistics for Innovative Product Technologies project (ILIPT). The project's main purpose is research and production descriptions of how a build to order system may be implemented for European vehicle manufacture. The key findings were presented to the European Commission and industry and were detailed in a book "Build to Order" In the project German OEMs were also involved, the project has garnered international interest.

Publications

 The Threat to Core Competence Posed by Developing Closer Supply Chain Relationships, International Journal of Logistics: Research and its Applications. 2006 
 Requirement for a Sea-change in Car Production in New Technologies for the Intelligent Design and Operation of Manufacturing Networks, (eds) Fraunhofer IRB Verlag. 2007 
 Outsourcing engineering commodity procurement, Supply Chain Management. 2008 
 Lean New Product Introduction: a UK in Lean Product Development - Concept & Models,  (eds) Icfai www.books.iupindia.org. 2008 
 The importance of knowledge management for ERP systems, International Journal of Logistics Research and Applications Volume 11 Issue 6. 2008 
 Build To Order: The Road to the 5-day Car, Springer. 2008  
 Lean Competence: integration of theories in operations management practice, Supply Chain Management Volume 15 Issue 3. 2010 
 Strategic outsourcing of core competences in the automotive industry: threat or opportunity?, International Journal of Automotive Technology and Management 9 (1). 2009

References

Academics of the University of Bath
Living people
Year of birth missing (living people)
Academics of the University of the West of England, Bristol